USS Kenwood may refer to the following ships of the United States Navy:

 , was a stern wheel steamer launched 3 April 1863 and sold 17 August 1865
 , was an oiler chartered by the US Navy on 16 November 1944 and sold for scrap 3 March 1948

United States Navy ship names